The 2018 Washington Huskies baseball team were representing the University of Washington in Seattle, Washington in the 2018 NCAA Division I baseball season. Head Coach Lindsay Meggs was in his 9th year coaching the Huskies. They play their home games at Husky Ballpark and were members of the Pac-12 Conference.

The Huskies finished third in the Pac-12. They won the Conway Regional and Fullerton Super Regional to reach the 2018 College World Series, their first time advancing to Omaha.

Roster

Schedule and results

Rankings

References

Washington
Washington Huskies baseball seasons
2018 in sports in Washington (state)
Washington
College World Series seasons